The Indiana Republican Party is the affiliate of the United States Republican Party in the state of Indiana. The chairman of the Indiana Republican State Committee is Kyle Hupfer.

History

Republicans dominated Indiana from the 1860s to the 1980s. Democrats gained some power at the state level in the late 1980s to early 2000s, but Republicans have regained domination of Indiana state politics since. At the presidential level, Franklin D. Roosevelt won Indiana in both 1932 and 1936, however, Roosevelt lost only 4 states in 1932 and 2 states in 1936. In 1964, when Barry Goldwater lost every state except for Arizona and 5 Deep South States, Lyndon B. Johnson won Indiana. In 2008, Barack Obama surprisingly won Indiana, however, Obama won most states by a much wider margin than he won Indiana and Obama only won Indiana by one percent. These are the only times Indiana has voted for the Democratic presidential candidate since Grover Cleveland, which makes Indiana among the nation's most reliably red states.

In the election of 1860, Abraham Lincoln won all of Indiana's thirteen electoral votes with 51.09% of the popular vote. When the American Civil War broke out, Indiana had a strong, pro-South Democratic Party in the Indiana General Assembly that, for the most part, claimed to be pro-Union but anti-abolition. Governor Oliver P. Morton (elected 1861), had a close relationship with President Lincoln, who called him the "shrewdest person I know". At the 1862 Loyal War Governors Conference in Altoona, Pennsylvania, Morton put his full support behind Lincoln's Emancipation Proclamation.

 A backlash followed the issuance of the emancipation, leading to a defeat of Republicans in the 1862 mid-term elections. Morton feared that the Democratic majority in the General Assembly would be sympathetic to the Confederacy, so he began to take steps to circumvent the General Assembly and mobilize Indiana in the war effort. When Morton stepped beyond the scope of his constitutional powers by establishing a state arsenal, the Democratic legislature moved to switch command of the militia from him to themselves. Fearing that with control of the militia, the Democrats would attempt to secede from the Union, Morton helped Republican legislators to flee to Kentucky and prevent a quorum. Unable to pass appropriations bills, the paralyzed government of Indiana teetered on bankruptcy until Morton once again stepped out of the scope of his powers and acquired millions of dollars in federal and private loans to keep the government running, support Indiana's role in the war effort, and circumvent the Democratic Assembly.

For the remainder of the Civil War, Morton made efforts to keep Indiana secure by suppressing elements he saw as anti-union or sympathetic to the South. The searches, arrests, and even disruption of the Democratic State Convention (in what would later be called the Battle of Pogue's Run) earned Morton much criticism and was called a "dictator" and "underhanded mobster". As the war ended and the Republican Party received an overwhelming majority in the government, Morton's questionable conduct during the war were made moot and he continued to serve a second term in the US Senate until 1877.

The party's darkest stain was after the First World War, following a rush of immigrants from eastern and southern Europe into the United States. By this period of time, the Indiana Republican Party, like the Republican Party elsewhere, had given up its former goal of African American rights and shared little in common with the Republican Party of the 1850s-1870s. Unlike the first Ku Klux Klan that rose in the South during the Reconstruction era to terrorize both white and black Republicans, this new Klan that started in Georgia in 1915 was a highly nativist organization that hid its racism in a cloak of family values and patriotism. Staunchly anti-immigrant, anti-Catholic, antisemitic, and prejudiced against African Americans, the new Klan spread into Indiana in the 1920s under Grand Dragon D.C. Stephenson. The second KKK was almost exclusively Republican in Midwestern states such as Indiana as well as Northern and Western states such as Maine and Colorado, although the KKK remained exclusively Democratic in the South. Under Stephenson's leadership, the Klan flourished in Indiana and took over both the Governor's Office and much of the Republican Party in the General Assembly. With over 250,000 white males (approximately forty-percent of Indiana's population) paying their Klan dues in Indiana, Stephenson amassed a fortune estimated from two to five million dollars.

In the 1924 Republican primary elections in Indiana, almost all candidates nominated for statewide office were Klansmen. One African American newspaper stated "the Ku Klux Klan has captured boot and breeches, the Republican party in Indiana and have [sic] turned what has been historically an organization of constitutional freedom into an agency for the promotion of religious and racial hate. Nobody now denies the Ku Klux Klan is the dominating power in Indiana Republican politics. In fact, the Republican party exists in Indiana today only in name. Its place has been usurped by the Klan purposes and leadership and issues." Most Indiana blacks in 1924 cast their first ever ballot for the Democratic Party, which had passed a resolution denouncing the KKK in its platform without mentioning the Klan by name. Blacks in other areas of the United States, in contrast, generally remained Republican until the following decade. Despite the influx of blacks into the Democratic party, Klansmen won most of the Indiana legislature and most statewide offices in the November 1924 general elections. However, once in office, the Klan-controlled legislature passed little to no anti-black, anti-Jewish or anti-Catholic legislation.

In 1922, when the Klan-dominated General Assembly tried to pass a Klan Day in the Indiana State Fair, Republican Governor Warren T. McCray vetoed the bill and earned the ire of Stephenson and the Klan. The peak of their power and influence was in 1925, when the Klan had McCray arrested, imprisoned, and thrown out of office on a charge of mail fraud and replaced with Republican Governor Edward Jackson, who was a KKK member. Stephenson is infamous for his words "I am the law in Indiana."

The Klan quickly fell apart under the revelation that Stephenson had abducted, raped, and murdered Madge Oberholtzer. More of a populist organization that believed in the Klan's image of defending the race and "Protestant Womanhood," the Klan's power and influence in both Indiana and its politics dissolved quickly. Governor Jackson refused to pardon Stephenson for Oberholtzer's death, so Stephenson retaliated from prison by revealing evidence that Jackson had received bribes from the Klan. Despite calls for his resignation for being associated with the Klan, Jackson's trial resulted in a hung jury.

Platform

The 2012 party platform contains the party's official stances on key issues, economic, political and social.

The first section of the platform states that the liberties guaranteed to us in the Constitution and Bill of Rights must be protected from erosion by government. The platform then states a commitment to "protecting and defending our U.S. and Indiana Constitutions," "fiscal responsibility," "federalism," "strong family structures," "individual responsibility," "personal liberty and freedom," "free and fair elections" and "volunteerism."

The Indiana GOP concurs with the current Indiana law that "childbirth is preferred, encouraged, and supported over abortion."

The party also believes that "strong families are the foundation of virtue and that such families bring forth citizens capable of self-government as well as properly motivated public servants so essential for a successful republic."

It stands by the national Republican Party that "limited government truly is good government" and states that the proper role of government is to get out of the way of entrepreneurs and job creators.

The party also supports paying down debt, balancing budgets, and lowering taxes coupled with a simplified tax code.

The Indiana Republican Party supports the use of Hoosier resources, including expanded clean coal technology, as a way to reduce dependence on foreign oil.

The platform states the belief of Indiana Republicans that Obamacare should be repealed and replaced with free market solutions.

One amendment was approved and added at the 2012 State Convention; "The Indiana Republican Party shall seek transparency, accountability and fairness in all levels of government, including a comprehensive audit of the Federal Reserve."

Current Indiana Republican officeholders
The Indiana Republican Party controls both U.S. Senate seats and seven of nine U.S. House seats. Republicans control all seven of the seven statewide constitutional offices. The party currently hold a majority in both the Indiana House of Representatives and the Indiana Senate.

Federal officials

U.S. Senate

U.S. House of Representatives
Rudy Yakym, 2nd District
Jim Banks, 3rd District
James Baird, 4th District
Victoria Spartz, 5th District
Greg Pence, 6th District
Larry Bucshon, 8th District
Erin Houchin, 9th District

Statewide officials
Governor: Eric Holcomb
Lieutenant Governor: Suzanne Crouch
Attorney General: Todd Rokita
Secretary of State: Diego Morales
Treasurer: Daniel Elliott
Auditor: Tera Klutz

State party chairmen since 1961
Thomas A. Gallmeyer (1961–1962) 
H. Dale Brown (1962–1963) 
Robert N. Stewart (1963–1965) 
Charles O. Hendricks (1965–1967) 
Buena Chaney (1967–1970)
John K. Snyder (1970–1972) 
James T. Neal (1972–1973) 
Thomas S. Milligan (1973–1977) 
Bruce B. Melchert (1977–1981) 
Gordon K. Durnil (1981–1989)
Virgil D. Scheidt (1989) 
Keith Luse (1989–1991) 
Rexford C. Early (1991–1993) 
Al Hubbard (1993–1994)
Mike McDaniel (1995–2002)
Jim Kittle (2002–2006)
Murray Clark (2006–2010)
Eric Holcomb (2010–2013)
Tim Berry (2013–2015)
Jeff Cardwell (2015–2017)
Kyle Hupfer (2017–)

Footnotes

Further reading

 Charles Zimmerman, "The Origin and Rise of the Republican Party in Indiana from 1854 to 1860," Indiana Magazine of History, Part 1: vol. 13, no. 3 (Sept. 1917), pp. 211–269; Part 2: vol. 13, no. 4 (Dec. 1917), pp. 349–412. Part 1 and Part 2 In JSTOR.

External links
Indiana Republican Party website
Indiana GOP County Websites
Indiana College Republicans
Indiana Republican Liberty Caucus

 
Republican
Indiana